The Zhovkva Castle occupies the principal square of the town of Zhovkva in Ukraine. It was founded by Polish Hetman Stanisław Żółkiewski as his fortified residence. Construction began in 1594 and was mostly completed in 1606.

The castle had a typically Serlian entrance arch and was encircled by moats (up to 17 meters in width). One wing of the building accommodated the arsenal and stables; another was immediately contiguous to the city wall. In 1606, a garden was laid out next to the hetman's residence. It contained a menagerie with wisents, deer, and chamois. The palatine chapel was consecrated in 1640.

The golden age of the Zolkiew Castle was the late 17th century when it passed through inheritance to Jakub Sobieski and then to his son John III, a native of Zhovkva. It was there that the king celebrated his victory under the walls of Vienna. In the 18th century the castle's facade was decorated with the statues of its owners from the Zolkiewski, Daniłowicz, Sobieski, and Radziwill families.

After the partition of Poland the castle fell into disuse and was auctioned off. During the 19th century the chapel and some other structures were dismantled or rebuilt to accommodate a local school. The castle sustained further damage during the First World War. Some restoration was undertaken just before the Second World War, but much more was required following the end of hostilities.

References
 Лильо І. М., Лильо-Откович З. М. Прогулянка Львовом. Путівник — К.: Балтія Друк, 2005. — 224 с.: іл.
 Памятники градостроительства и архитектуры Украинской ССР. Киев: Будивельник, 1983—1986. Том 3, с. 152.

Castles in Ukraine
Zhovkva
Houses completed in 1606
Buildings and structures in Lviv Oblast
1606 establishments in the Polish–Lithuanian Commonwealth